Discovery is the debut studio album by American R&B/pop singer Shanice, released October 21, 1987 by A&M Records. Shanice at the time was fourteen years old. The singles "(Baby Tell Me) Can You Dance", and "No 1/2 Steppin'" were top 10 R&B hits. "The Way You Love Me", and "I'll Bet She's Got a Boyfriend" were the final singles from the album.

Will Downing covered the song "Just a Game" on his 1995 album Moods.

Track listing
 All songs written and arranged by Bryan Loren

"I Think I Love You" – 3:39
"No 1/2 Steppin'" – 4:56
"(Baby Tell Me) Can You Dance" – 4:49
"Spend Some Time with Me" – 4:01
"He's So Cute" – 3:40
"I'll Bet She's Got a Boyfriend" – 4:36
"Do I Know You" – 5:41
"Just a Game" – 4:32
"The Way You Love Me" – 4:12

Personnel
 Bryan Loren – keyboards, bass guitar, synthesizers, guitars, drum programming
 Recording and mixing engineers: Paul McKenna, John Hedeges, Sabrina Buchanen, Richard Cottrell, Bryan Loren
 Executive producer – John McClain

Charts

Weekly charts

Year-end charts

Singles

Notes
"Summer Love" was the B-side for the lead single, "(Baby Tell Me) Can You Dance".

References

1987 debut albums
Shanice albums
A&M Records albums